Count Franjo Frankopan Cetinski (died 1543) was a Croatian nobleman and Latinist.

Frankopan was the son of knez (prince) Ivan Frankopan Cetinski and the member of Cetin branch of the Frankopan family. His given name was Ivan, but after joining the Franciscan order he took the name Franjo. He followed the steps of his uncle Grgur and became archbishop of Kalocsa and bishop of Eger. He also served as diplomat on the court of Janos Zapolya. In 1541, he attended the Diet of Regensburg where he made a speech against the Turks (Oratio reverendissimi in Christo patris) which was soon printed.

See also

 Frankopan family tree
 Skrad castle

Sources 

 Franjo Emanuel Hoško: Franjo Frankapan (Hrvatski biografski leksikon, Croatian)

Frankopan family
Medieval Croatian nobility
16th-century Croatian Roman Catholic priests
16th-century Roman Catholic bishops in Hungary
Habsburg Croats
15th-century Croatian nobility
16th-century Croatian nobility
People from Eger
1543 deaths
Eastern Hungarian Kingdom